Kirk Joseph (born 1961) is a jazz sousaphone player from New Orleans, Louisiana. The son of trombonist Waldren "Frog" Joseph, Kirk Joseph began playing the sousaphone while a student at Andrew Bell Middle School, and took part in his first professional gig at the age of fifteen when his brother Charles invited him to play a funeral with the Majestic Band.

In 1977 he became one of the founding members of the Dirty Dozen Brass Band, a group which is credited with reviving the brass band tradition in New Orleans. He has played with the Treme Brass Band and Forgotten Souls Brass Band, and currently leads his own group called Kirk Joseph's Backyard Groove.

Described as a "modern sousaphone pioneer", Joseph claims inspiration from renowned New Orleans tuba player Anthony "Tuba Fats" Lacen. In an interview with The Times-Picayune Joseph described the effect Lacen's playing had on his own: "He was the first person I ever heard walking the sousaphone, making it sound like bass.... I took it from there." The style of playing created by Lacen and Joseph was instrumental in establishing the modern New Orleans brass band sound, which combines traditional marching band and Dixieland traditions with strong jazz and funk influences.

References

1961 births
Living people
Jazz musicians from New Orleans
American jazz tubists
American male jazz musicians
Rhythm and blues musicians from New Orleans
Dirty Dozen Brass Band members
21st-century tubists
21st-century American male musicians
Treme Brass Band members
21st-century African-American musicians
20th-century African-American people